= Cottonwood, Nevada =

Former community in Nevada, US

Coordinates: 40°38′00″N 115°52′03″W

Cottonwood is a former community in Elko County, Nevada, United States. The community was a stagecoach station on the Shepherd toll road located 25 miles (40 km) south of Elko.
